Acutifolin A is bio-active isolate of the bark of Brosimum acutifolium, a Brazilian folk medicine ("Mururé").

References 

Natural phenols